Idaea gemmata is a species of geometrid moth in the family Geometridae. It is found in North America.

The MONA or Hodges number for Idaea gemmata is 7116.

References

Further reading

External links

 

Sterrhini
Articles created by Qbugbot
Moths described in 1876